Bryan Mark Rigg (born March 16, 1971) is an American author and speaker.

Rigg is the author of several highly regarded books on World War II history, including Hitler's Jewish Soldiers: The Untold Story of Nazi Racial Laws and Men of Jewish Descent in the German Military and The Rabbi Saved by Hitler's Soldiers: Rebbe Joseph Isaac Schneersohn and His Astonishing Rescue.

In addition to his writing, Rigg has also worked as a professor of history at several universities, including American Military University, Southern Methodist University, and the U.S. Military Academy at West Point. He has been a frequent contributor to various media outlets, including CNN, NPR, and The New York Times.

Biography
Born and reared as a Baptist, Rigg studied at Phillips Exeter Academy, graduating in 1991 continued on to Yale University, and received his B.A. in 1996. He received a grant from the Henry Fellowship, to continue his studies in Cambridge University, where Rigg earned his doctorate in 2002. In the summer of 1994 he went to Germany, and met Peter Millies, an elderly man who helped Rigg understand the German in a movie they were watching, Europa Europa, about Shlomo Perl, a full Jew who "hid in plain sight" in the Nazi army, posing as a Volksdeutsche orphan named Josef Peters. Millies later told Rigg that he himself was a part-Jew, and introduced him to the subject which was to become his main research topic for many years.

Rigg discovered a large number of "Mischlinge" (part-Jews) who were members of the National Socialist German Workers Party (or "Nazi" Party) and/or served in the German Armed Forces during World War II. In the 1990s, he travelled throughout the world, primarily Austria and Germany, and interviewed hundreds of these men. His assembled documents, videotapes, and wartime memoirs on the subject are presented as the Bryan Mark Rigg Collection at the Military Archives branch of the Federal German Archives (Bundesarchiv) in Freiburg, Germany.

He has taught as a lecturer at Southern Methodist University and American Military University.

His claims have been used both by Holocaust researchers, as well as Holocaust denial and anti-Zionist groups.

His book Hitler's Jewish Soldiers earned him the Colby Award (for first books in military history) in 2003. Before his work was published, his research was picked up by several newspapers, most notably the London Telegraph, the New York Times and the Los Angeles Times, causing much sensation and generating a lot of criticism from some historians. He has been endorsed by such historians like Michael Berenbaum, Robert Citino, Stephen Fritz, James Corum, Paula Hyman, Nathan Stoltzfus, Norman Naimark, Jonathan Steinberg, Geoffrey P. Megargee, Dennis Showalter and James Tent. He has published several other books since then: Rescued From the Reich, with a foreword by Paula Hyman (Yale University Press 2004), Lives of Hitler's Jewish Soldiers (Kansas, 2009) and The Rabbi Saved by Hitler's Soldiers, with a foreword by Michael Berenbaum (Kansas, 2016).

Recent activities
According to the German Academic Exchange Service, he worked in the Private Banking Division of Credit Suisse as a Private Wealth Manager from 2006 to 2008. He has since set up his own firm called RIGG Wealth Management.

Criticism
Scholars, like Richard J. Evans, Regius Professor of History at the University of Cambridge, and Omer Bartov, professor of history at Brown University, consider the titles of Rigg's books, such as Hitler's Jewish Soldiers, misleading, because the books are not about Jews as the term is commonly understood, but in almost all cases about Mischlinge ("half-"Jews and "quarter-"Jews) as defined by the Nuremberg laws but not according to Jewish religious law.

Bibliography
 Hitler's Jewish Soldiers: The Untold Story of Nazi Racial Laws and Men of Jewish Descent in the German Military, University Press of Kansas, 2002. 
 Rescued from the Reich: How one of Hitler's Soldiers Saved the Lubavitcher Rebbe, Yale University Press, 2004. 
 Lives of Hitler's Jewish Soldiers: The Untold Stories of Hitler's Jewish Soldiers University of Kansas Press, 2009. 
 The Rabbi Saved by Hitler's Soldiers: Rebbe Joseph Isaac Schneersohn and His Astonishing Rescue University of Kansas Press, 2016. 
 Flamethrower: Iwo Jima Medal of Honor Recipient and U.S. Marine Woody Williams and His Controversial Award, Japan's Holocaust and the Pacific War Fidelis Historia, 2020. 
 Conquering Learning Disabilities at Any Age: How An ADHD/LD Kid Graduated From Yale and Cambridge, Became A Marine Officer, Military Historian, Financial Advisor And Caring Father Fidelis Historia, 2022.

See also
 Meno Burg (1789–1853), the highest-ranking Jewish officer in the Prussian army.

References

External links
 
  Article on Bryan Mark Rigg and his books.
  Neo-Nazi 'Liberal-Fascism.com' website.
  Bryan Mark Rigg website.
  Flamethrower Book Website.

Living people
1971 births
Holocaust studies
Converts to Judaism
Jewish American writers
Yale University alumni
Alumni of the University of Cambridge
American male writers
21st-century American Jews